David Madlener (born March 31, 1992) is an Austrian professional ice hockey Goaltender who currently plays for Pioneers Vorarlberg in the ICE Hockey League (ICEHL). He formerly played with fellow Austrian clubs, Dornbirn Bulldogs and EC KAC. He served as the extra backup to the Austrian national team at the 2015 IIHF World Championship. On April 22, 2016, Madlener left Dornbirn and signed a one-year deal with EC KAC.

References

External links

1992 births
Living people
Austrian ice hockey goaltenders
Dornbirn Bulldogs players
EC KAC players
People from Feldkirch, Vorarlberg
Sportspeople from Vorarlberg